WILQ (105.1 FM) is a commercial FM radio station licensed to serve Williamsport, Pennsylvania. The station is owned by Van Michael, through licensee Backyard Broadcasting of Pennsylvania LLC, and broadcasts a country music format. The station is an affiliate of ABC Radio and Motor Racing Network.

WILQ uses HD Radio, and broadcasts Family Life Network christian radio programming on its HD2 subchannel, which is simulcast on four FM translators. In addition, WILQ utilizes HD Radio, and broadcasts Twin Valley's Talk Network Talk radio programming on its HD3 subchannel, which is simulcast on WWPA and WMLP, and two FM translators.

History
The Federal Communications Commission granted Lycoming County Broadcasting Company a construction permit for the station on April 29, 1947 with the WLYC-FM call sign. The station was granted its first license on August 18, 1950.

Translators
The following four translators are licensed to Family Life Ministries, Inc., and simulcast Family Life Network programming broadcast on WILQ-HD2:

References

External links

ILQ
Radio stations established in 1992